Armando Xavier Ochoa, D.D., (born April 9, 1943) is an American prelate of the Roman Catholic Church.  He served as bishop of the Diocese of Fresno in California (2011 to 2019), bishop of the Diocese of El Paso in Texas (1996 to 2011) and auxiliary bishop of the Archdiocese of Los Angeles in California (1986 to 1996).

Biography

Early life
Armando Xavier Ochoa was born on April 9, 1943, in Oxnard, California. The second child of Angel and Mary Ochoa, he attended Santa Clara Elementary School in that city. Ochoa graduated from Santa Clara High School in 1961, then entered St. John’s Seminary College in Camarillo, California, in 1962 and later, St. John’s Seminary School of Theology in Camarillo.

Priesthood 
Ochoa was ordained into the priesthood by Cardinal Timothy Manning for the Archdiocese of Los Angeles on May 23, 1970. After his ordination, Ochoa was assigned as assistant pastor over time at three parishes in Southern California:  

 St. Alphonsus in East Los Angeles 
 St. John the Baptist in Baldwin Park 
 St. Teresa of Avila in Los Angeles  

In 1982, while working at St. Teresa, Ochoa was named by the Vatican as chaplain of his holiness, with the title of monsignor.  Two years later, Ochoa was appointed pastor of Sacred Heart Parish in Los Angeles.

Ochoa's archdiocesan positions included co-director of the Permanent Diaconate Program, heading the Secretariat for Ethnic Ministry Services, He was also a member of the board for Don Bosco Technical High School in Rosemead, California, and St. John’s Seminary.

Auxiliary Bishop of Los Angeles

Ochoa was named titular bishop of Sitifis and an auxiliary bishop for the Archdiocese of Los Angeles by Pope John Paul II in December 1986. Ochoa was consecrated on February 23, 1987, by Cardinal Roger Mahony.

Bishop of El Paso 
On April 1, 1996, John Paul II named Ochoa as bishop of the Diocese of El Paso.  He was installed on June 26. Between 1999 and 2009, there were only two ordinations to the priesthood in the Diocese of El Paso.

Bishop of Fresno 
On December 1, 2011, Pope Benedict XVI appointed Ochoa as bishop of the Diocese of Fresno,  succeeding Bishop John Steinbock, who had died of lung cancer in December 2010. On February 1, 2019, Ochoa announced an outside investigation of the records of Diocese of Fresno for all allegations of sexual abuse against clerics since 1922, with a report to be issued to the public after the investigation had concluded.

On March 5, 2019, Pope Francis accepted Ochoa's letter of resignation as bishop of the Diocese of Fresno.

Positions
Ochoa considers the ordination of woman priests to be a moot point due to papal opposition; he believes that gay men and lesbians should remain celibate in accordance with Church doctrine requiring all unmarried people to remain celibate; he believes that the priest shortage will be solved through faith rather than through allowing priests to marry; and he fears that teaching children about condoms in a school setting would send a "mixed message" regarding premarital sex.

Ochoa is an advocate of diocesan foster care programs and responsible water use.

See also

References

External links

Roman Catholic Diocese of Fresno Official Site
Catholic Diocese of El Paso Retrieved: 2010-03-18.

1943 births
Living people
People from Oxnard, California
St. John's Seminary (California) alumni
20th-century Roman Catholic bishops in the United States
21st-century Roman Catholic bishops in the United States
Roman Catholic bishops of El Paso
American people of Mexican descent
Catholics from California